Palm-wine music (known as maringa in Sierra Leone) is a West African musical genre. It evolved among the Kru people of Liberia and Sierra Leone, who used Portuguese guitars brought by sailors, combining local melodies and rhythms with Trinidadian calypso to create a "light, easy, lilting style". It would initially work its way inland where it would adopt a more traditional style than what was played in coastal areas.

It would eventually gain popularity after Sierra Leone musician Ebenezer Calendar recorded songs in the 1950s and 1960s and continues to hold a small amount of that popularity.

Etymology 
Palm-wine music was named after a drink, palm wine, made from the naturally fermented sap of the oil palm, which was drunk at gatherings where early African guitarists played.

History 
This music was created from a fusion of local and foreign sailors, dock workers, and local working-class people who would go to palm-wine bars to drink and listen to music. Portable instruments and local string and percussion merged to create this style. It was out of this genre that the traditional two-finger plucking of a guitar came when musicians played it similarly to how they played the local lute or harp. This style was typically played in a syncopated 4/4 metre.

1920s-1940s 
In the 1920s, a Kru taught Ghanaian highlife guitarist Kwame Asare (or Jacob Sam). His Kumasi Trio made their first highlife recordings for Zonophone in London in 1928. As the music spread from the coast into the hinterland, the sound of the traditional Akan harp lute seperewa was infused and this evolved into the odonson or Akan blues and was called the "Native Blues". HMV Records and Parlophone Records distributed albums of the Akan blues in southern Ghana. This was in the 1930s and 1940s and featured artists like Jacob Sam, Kwesi Pepera, Appianing, Kwame, Mireku, Osei Bonsu, Kwesi Menu, Kamkan and Appiah Adjekum.  At its peak of popularity in the 1930s, there would be about 200,000 Native Blues records sold per year before production was stopped due to World War II.

1950s-1960s 
Palm-wine music was first popularized by Sierra Leone Creole musician Ebenezer Calendar & His Maringa Band, who recorded many popular songs in the 1950s and early 1960s. Soukous and highlife were influenced by palm-wine music. Though still somewhat popular, the genre is no longer as renowned as it once was. Other renowned palm-wine musicians include Koo Nimo (a.k.a. Daniel Amponsah), S. E. Rogie, Abdul Tee-Jay and Super Combo.

Agya Koo Nimo is another renowned Ghanaian singer who is popularly referred to as the "King of Palm-wine music". The "Grandfather of Highlife", as he's often called, uses his music to tell life stories which has greatly influenced the Ghanaian and other West African music scenes. He was awarded the lifetime achievers award at the University of Education Winneba in Ghana.

See also
Music of Sierra Leone
Music of Liberia

References

External links 
A brief introduction to palm wine music
King of Palm Wine Music - Koo Nimo
Palm wine music

Liberian styles of music
Sierra Leonean styles of music
Kru people
Sierra Leone Creole people
Sierra Leone Creole music